Perrissona Gappit (also Perrussone) was tried for witchcraft in 1465 in Switzerland.

Background

Witch trials were still uncommon in the 15th century when the concept of diabolical witchcraft began to emerge. The study of four chronicles concerning events in Valais, the Bernese Alps and the nearby region of Dauphiné has supported the scholarly proposal that some ideas concerning witchcraft were taking hold in the region around the 1430s recasting witchcraft as an alliance with the devil that would undermine and threaten the Christian foundation of society.

Studies of the case
The case was first studied in 1909. It has been the subject of several scholarly writings that have considered different aspects of the trial. One study from 1976 noted the charges changed mid-trial from sorcery to diabolical witchcraft. Another study published in 1989 explored details about the backgrounds of the accused. Scholars have also examined the unstable political situation in Châtel in the 1460s in connection with the case.

Trial and execution
The case, tried in the area of modern-day Fribourg, Switzerland, is noted for the thoroughness of the surviving record. The records include pre-trial depositions, include Perissone's own deposition, and several witnesses.

Trials for witchcraft in what Kieckhefer calls the "popular tradition" were limited to accusations of sorcery but consorting with the Devil was not a factor in the standard accusations of cursing animals and causing bad weather. Perrissona was accused by two witnesses of trying to kidnap an infant, causing the death of the infant by malicious magic and preparing food that made others ill. She denied the allegations until the inquisitorial vicar became involved. The inquisitor was specifically interested in the diabolical element of the crimes. According to Kieckhefer, the role of the Devil in these types of allegations began with "the learned tradition of the judges".

Under the new questioning, Perrissona eventually confessed to meeting with the Devil and eating the flesh of an infant at a diabolical assembly, even while the testifying witness has made no such allegation. Some of the confessions were extracted under torture.

After the trial Perrissona was sentenced to death and burned in public.

References

Witch trials in Switzerland